AfricaRail is a project to link the railway systems of Ivory Coast, Burkina Faso, Niger, Benin and Togo.  These are all  gauge.

Timeline

2022 

 Jeremie Taieb takes the Head of the Strategic Steering Committee, in order to finance the project with international donors

2020 
 Ghana orders new standard gauge rail equipment 
 Ghana Eastern SG line approved

2019 
 8 Apr 2019 Ghana's Ministry of Railways Development has reached an agreement with GERC to construct the Tema - Accra - Koforidua - Kumasi eastern line (340 km)
 Ghana Standard Gauge - Western Line

2015 
Various links. 
 West African rail loop of 2740 km.
  Abidjan to  Ouagadougou line.
 proposed new line linking  Ouagadougou in Burkina Faso to  Niamey in Niger.
 proposed new line linking  Niger and  Parakou in Benin.
 rehabilitation of the existing line to  Cotonou in Benin.
 new link to  Lomé in Togo.

See also 
 Dakar-Port Sudan Railway
 West Africa Regional Rail Integration

External links 
 ECOWAS
 ECOWAS 
 UNECA Map

References 

Rail transport in Africa
Rail transport in Benin
Rail transport in Burkina Faso
Rail transport in Ivory Coast
Rail transport in Niger
Rail transport in Togo
Rail transport in Ghana